Mississippi Highway 15 (MS 15) is a state highway in Mississippi. At almost , it is the longest highway in the Mississippi Highway System. MS 15 is divided into two sections due to a large gap between Stone County and Perry County. The southern section begins at Interstate 10 (I-10) and I-110 in Biloxi and ends at a junction with MS 26 near Wiggins, and the northern section begins at a junction with U.S. Route 98 (US 98) near Beaumont and ends as a continuation as SR 125 near Walnut. It serves a total of 15 counties (Harrison, Stone, Perry, Jones, Jasper, Newton, Neshoba, Winston, Choctaw, Webster, Oktibbeha, Chickasaw, Pontotoc, Union, and Tippah).

History
Prior to 1966, MS 15 was one continuous route through the entire state of Mississippi. The route formerly continued past I-10 and ran concurrent with I-110 to terminate at US 90.

Major intersections

References

External links

Magnolia Meanderings

015
Transportation in Harrison County, Mississippi
Transportation in Stone County, Mississippi
Transportation in Perry County, Mississippi
Transportation in Jones County, Mississippi
Transportation in Jasper County, Mississippi
Transportation in Newton County, Mississippi
Transportation in Neshoba County, Mississippi
Transportation in Winston County, Mississippi
Transportation in Choctaw County, Mississippi
Transportation in Webster County, Mississippi
Transportation in Chickasaw County, Mississippi
Transportation in Pontotoc County, Mississippi
Transportation in Union County, Mississippi
Transportation in Tippah County, Mississippi